China: The Panda Adventure is a 2001 film directed by Robert M. Young and based on the true story of the expedition of Ruth Harkness, who brought the first live giant panda to the United States. It stars Maria Bello and Yu Xia.

Plot
Set in 1936 China, Ruth Harkness has come to settle the affairs of her husband, Bill, who died while observing the rare and unstudied panda bear. His journal describes the panda as shy and docile, while great white hunter Dak Johnson describes them as ferocious beasts. This intrigues her, and she sets off to retrace Bill's steps and save the pandas from Johnson. She encounters many obstacles, both natural and created by Johnson.

Cast
 Maria Bello as Ruth Harkness
 Yu Xia as Quentin Young
 Xander Berkeley as Dakar Johnston
 Paul Pape as Bill Harkness
 Bill Hayes as Narrator

References

External links
 

Films about giant pandas
2001 films
Films directed by Robert M. Young
Films scored by Randy Edelman
2000s English-language films